Spell(s) or The Spell(s) may refer to:

Processes 
 Spell (paranormal), an incantation
 Spell (ritual), a magical ritual
 Spelling, the writing of words

Arts and entertainment

Film and television 
 The Spell (1977 film), an American television film
 The Spell (2009 film), a British horror film
 Spell (film), a 2020 American horror film directed by Mark Tonderai
 "Spell" (Smallville), a television episode

Literature 
 The Spell (novel), a 1998 novel by Alan Hollinghurst
 Spells (anthology), a 1985 anthology of fantasy and science fiction short stories
 Spells (novel), a 2010 novel by Aprilynne Pike
 Spell No. 7, a 1979 choreopoem by Ntozake Shange

Music 
 Enharmonic spelling, how a musical note is indicated
 Spells, a choral work by Richard Rodney Bennett

Performers 
 Spell, a 1993 duo consisting of Boyd Rice and Rose McDowall
 The Spells, a duo consisting of Carrie Brownstein and Mary Timony

Albums 
 Spel, by Bukkene Bruse, 2004
 Spell (album), by Deon Estus, or the title song, 1989
 Spells (album), by the Comas, 2007
 The Spell (Alphabeat album) or the title song (see below), 2009
 The Spell (The Black Heart Procession album), or the title song, 2006
 The Spell (Cellar Darling album) or the title song, 2019
 The Spell (Ivan Doroschuk album) or the title song, 1997
 The Spell (Kirka album), 1987
 The Spell, by Syreeta Wright, 1983
 Spell (EP), by DIA, 2016
 Spell, an EP by Noelia, or the title song, 2014

Songs 
 "The Spell" (song), by Alphabeat, 2009
 "Spell", by Hot Chip from A Bath Full of Ecstasy, 2019
 "Spell", by Patti Smith from Peace and Noise, 1997
 "The Spell", by Four Letter Lie from A New Day, 2009

Other media 
 Spell (gaming), in role-playing games or game systems, a set of rules used to portray magic
 The Spell, a 1797–98 painting by Francisco Goya

Other uses 
 SPELL, an organization that promotes the constructed language Ladin Dolomitan
 spell (Unix), a spell checker program
 William Spell, American entrepreneur

See also 
 
 
 
 Spelling (disambiguation)
 Spell House (disambiguation)
 Dizzy Spells (disambiguation)
 Dry Spell (disambiguation)